Speculitermes sinhalensis, is a species of termite of the genus Speculitermes. It is native to India and Sri Lanka. It was first found from Vavuniya. They are typical subterranean soil humus feeding termites, which can be found under logs, decaying trees, rocks.

References

External links
Diversity of termites in a young eucalypt plantation in the tropical forests of Kerala, India
Record of a gregarine (Apicomplexa: Neogregarinida) in the abdomen of the termite Coptotermes gestroi (Isoptera, Rhinotermitidae)
Termites from Garhwal, Uttarakhand (Insecta: Isoptera), with New Distributional Records
Evolution and Systematic Significance of Wing Micro-sculpturing
Faunistic studies on termites (Isoptera) of Shivamogga district and evaluation of new insecticides

Termites
Insects described in 1960
Insects of Sri Lanka